Akwasi Fobi-Edusei (born 12 September 1986), sometimes listed as Akwasi Fobe-Edusei or simply Akwasi Edusei,  is an English former professional footballer.

Playing career
Born in Camberwell, London, he began his career with Gillingham, where he made 9 appearances in The Football League. He has also played on loan for Welling United and Farnborough. In 2013, he was released by Burgess Hill Town and was signed by Hastings United on a free transfer. On 28 November he joined Horsham but failed to start a match, making 13 substitute appearances, before joining Crawley Down Gatwick in March 2014.

References

1986 births
Living people
Footballers from Camberwell
English footballers
Association football defenders
Gillingham F.C. players
Welling United F.C. players
Walton & Hersham F.C. players
Ramsgate F.C. players
East Thurrock United F.C. players
Tonbridge Angels F.C. players
Farnborough F.C. players
Halesowen Town F.C. players
Margate F.C. players
Burgess Hill Town F.C. players
Hastings United F.C. players
Horsham F.C. players
Crawley Down Gatwick F.C. players
English Football League players
Isthmian League players
Black British sportspeople